Hayden Quinn is an Australian cook. He is best known for appearing on Series 3 of MasterChef Australia and as a judge on Nine Network cooking program Family Food Fight.

Career 
Quinn has currently written two cookbooks: Dish It Up and Surfing the Menu (with Dan Churchill).  

Hayden is also co-owner of The Cube Gym, host of South African television program Hayden Quinn South Africa, partner in Kooks Wines, regular contributor to Delicious magazine and Starlight Foundation ambassador. 

He also holds a Bachelor of Science in Marine Biology.

Personal life 
Quinn has been in a relationship with American model Jax Raynor since 2015. They have been engaged since 2021.

References

Living people
1986 births
Australian chefs
Australian exercise and fitness writers
Australian exercise instructors
Australian health and wellness writers
Australian television chefs
MasterChef Australia
Participants in Australian reality television series
Writers from Sydney